Paralakhemundi (Sl. No.: 137) is a Vidhan Sabha constituency of Gajapati district, Odisha.

This constituency includes Paralakhemundi, Kashinagara, Paralakhemundi block, Gumma block and Kashinagara block.

Elected members

Fifteen elections were held between 1951 and 2014.
Elected members from the Paralakhemundi constituency are:
2019: (137): K. Narayana Rao (BJP) 
2014: (137): Kengam Surya Rao (Congress)
2009: (137): K. Narayana Rao (BJD)
2004: (79): Trinath Sahu (Congress)
2000: (79): Trinath Sahu (Congress)
1995: (79): Trinath Sahu (Independent)
1990: (79): Darapu Lachana Naidu (Janata Dal)
1985: (79): Trinath Sahu (Congress)
1980: (79): Bijoy Kumar Jena (Independent)
1977: (79): Bijoy Kumar Jena (Independent)
1974: (79): Nalla Kurmunaikulu (Utkal Congress)
1971: (75): Gangadhar Madi (Swatantra Party)
1967: (75): Nalla Kurmunaikulu (Congress)
1961: (13): Nalla Kurmunaikulu (Congress)
1957: (10): Nalla Kurmunaikulu (Independent)
1951: (106): Jagannath Misra (Communist)

2019 Election result

2014 Election result
In 2014 election, Indian National Congress candidate Kengam Surya Rao defeated  Biju Janata Dal candidate K. Narayana Rao by a margin of 1419 votes.

2009 Election result
In 2009 election, Biju Janata Dal candidate K. Narayana Rao defeated Indian National Congress candidate Trinath Sahu by a margin of 14,941 votes.

Notes

References

Assembly constituencies of Odisha
Gajapati district